Tlake is a settlement in the Municipality of Rogatec in eastern Slovenia. The area traditionally belonged to the Styria region. It is now included in the Savinja Statistical Region.

Name
The name Tlake is derived from the Slovene common noun tlaka, originally referring to voluntary collective labor, and later to corvée under feudalism. It refers to a place where collective labor was performed. Because places with this name generally do not lie near old Roman roads, the suggestion that the name is derived from tlak 'pavement' is unlikely.

Notable people
Notable people that were born or lived in Tlake include:
Jože Šmit (1922–2004), poet and translator.

References

External links
Tlake on Geopedia

Populated places in the Municipality of Rogatec